Clowning Around is a 1992 Australian family film that was shot on location in Perth, Western Australia and Paris, France. It was based on the novel Clowning Sim by David Martin.

The film was produced by independent film company Barron Entertainment Films in Western Australia and educational film company WonderWorks in the United States, was directed by George Whaley. It was distributed by Australian Broadcasting Corporation. It featured Australian actors such as Clayton Williamson, Noni Hazelhurst, Ernie Dingo, Rebecca Smart, and Jill Perryman, and also featured veteran American actor Van Johnson along with French actor Jean-Michel Dagory.

This series was followed up with a sequel entitled Clowning Around 2, which was released in 1993.

Plot
Simon Gunner, is a star-struck foster kid who aspires to become a circus clown. With the help of veteran funster Jack Merrick, Simon ultimately fulfills his goal.

Cast
Clayton Williamson as Simon Gunner
Annie Byron as Una Crealy
Jean-Michel Dagory as Anatole Tolin
Ernie Dingo as Jack Merrick
Van Johnson as Mr. Ranthow
Rebecca Smart as Linda Crealy
Noni Hazlehurst as Sarah Gunner
Jill Perryman as Miss Gabhurst
Steve Jodrell as Skipper Crealy
Heath Ledger as orphan (uncredited)

References

External links 
 
 

1992 films
Australian Broadcasting Corporation original programming
Australian children's television series
French children's films
Australian children's films
Australian independent films
PBS original programming
Films about orphans
1990s children's films
Films about clowns
1990s English-language films
1990s Australian films
1990s French films